5th SFFCC Awards
December 12, 2006

Best Picture: 
 Little Children 
The 5th San Francisco Film Critics Circle Awards, honoring the best in film for 2006, were given on 12 December 2006.

Winners

Best Picture:
Little Children
Best Director:
Paul Greengrass - United 93
Best Original Screenplay:
Brick - Rian Johnson
Best Adapted Screenplay:
Little Children - Todd Field and Tom Perrotta
Best Actor:
Sacha Baron Cohen - Borat
Best Actress:
Helen Mirren - The Queen
Best Supporting Actor:
Jackie Earle Haley - Little Children
Best Supporting Actress:
Adriana Barraza - Babel
Best Foreign Language Film:
Pan's Labyrinth (El laberinto del fauno) • Mexico/Spain/United States
Best Documentary:
An Inconvenient Truth
Marlon Riggs Award (for courage & vision in the Bay Area film community):
Stephen Salmons, co-founder and artistic director of the San Francisco Silent Film Festival
Special Citation (in honor of Arthur Lazere, a member of the critics group and founder of culturevulture.net who died earlier this year):
The Death of Mr. Lazarescu (Moartea domnului Lãzãrescu)

External links
2006 San Francisco Film Critics Circle Awards

References
SF Film Critics Awards announced

San Francisco Film Critics Circle Awards
2006 film awards
2006 in San Francisco